Malcolm Etheridge  Grant (born 6 August 1944) is an Anglican priest.

He was born on 6 August 1944, educated at Dunfermline High School, the University of Edinburgh and Edinburgh Theological College and ordained in 1970. His first post was as Assistant Priest at St. Mary's Cathedral, Glasgow after which he was Vicar of Grantham. In that year he became Vicar of Eaton Bray with Edlesborough and in 2004  Rural Dean of Dunstable, retiring from both posts in 2009.

Notes

1944 births
People educated at Dunfermline High School
Alumni of the University of Edinburgh
Provosts of St Mary's Cathedral, Glasgow
Provosts of Inverness Cathedral
Living people